Year's Best SF 2 is a science fiction anthology edited by David G. Hartwell that was published in 1997.  It is the second in the Year's Best SF series.

Contents

The book itself, as well as each of the stories, has a short
introduction by the editor.

Dave Wolverton: "After a Lean Winter" (Originally in F&SF, 1996)
Terry Bisson: "In the Upper Room" (Originally in Playboy, 1996)
John Brunner: "Thinkertoy" (Originally in The Williamson Effect, 1996)
Gregory Benford: "Zoomers" (Originally in Future Net, 1996)
Sheila Finch: "Out of the Mouths" (Originally in F&SF, 1996)
James Patrick Kelly: "Breakaway, Backdown" (Originally in Asimov's, 1996)
Yves Meynard: "Tobacco Words" (Originally in Tomorrow, 1995)
Joanna Russ: "Invasion" (Originally in Asimov's, 1996)
Brian Stableford: "The House of Mourning" (Originally in Off Limits: Tales of Alien Sex, 1996)
Damon Knight: "Life Edit" (Originally in Science Fiction Age, 1996)
Robert Reed: "First Tuesday" (Originally in F&SF, 1996)
David Langford: "The Spear of the Sun" (Originally in Interzone, 1996)
Gene Wolfe: "Counting Cats in Zanzibar" (Originally in Asimov's, 1996)
Bruce Sterling: "Bicycle Repairman" (Originally in Intersections: The Sycamore Hill Anthology, 1996)
Gwyneth Jones: "Red Sonja and Lessingham in Dreamland" (Originally in Off Limits: Tales of Alien Sex, 1996)
Allen Steele: "Doblin's Lecture" (Originally in Pirate Writings, 1996)
Kathleen Ann Goonan: "The Bride of Elvis" (Originally in Science Fiction Age, 1996)
Kate Wilhelm: "Forget Luck" (Originally in F&SF, 1996)
Connie Willis: "Nonstop to Portales" (Originally in The Williamson Effect, 1996)
Stephen Baxter: "Columbiad" (Originally in Science Fiction Age, 1996)

External links 

1997 anthologies
Year's Best SF anthology series
1990s science fiction works